Galena High School is a public school in Galena, Kansas, United States. The school colors are blue and white and the school mascot is a bulldog.

Jacob LaTurner is an alumnus.

See also
 List of high schools in Kansas
 List of unified school districts in Kansas

References

Public high schools in Kansas
Education in Cherokee County, Kansas